Kulappurakkal Karunakaran Nair (2 February 1931 – 7 February 2013) alias K.K. Nair was an Indian politician who was a member of the legislative assembly of Kerala state, India, representing Pathanamthitta for 34 years, from 1972 until 2006.

He was born on 2 February 1931. 
An independent MLA of Pathanamthitta for long time, he joined the Indian National Congress after the establishment of Pathanamthitta district and again won as the MLA of Pathanamthitta. As a member of the Pathanamthitta constituency, he served in the 3rd, 4th, 6th, 7th, 8th, 9th, 10th and  11th session of the Kerala Legislative Assembly. He was a former member of Communist Party of India (Marxist) from 1959 to 1979.

He was President, Pathanamthitta Plantations Labour Union; Chairman and President, Malanadu Trade Union Congress.

Nair is fondly remembered by the natives of Pathanamthitta district, for fulfilling their dream. The story goes like this: Once, the parts of current Pathanamthitta district were parts of now-neighbouring Kollam and Alappuzha districts. As a result, people had to go for a long distance for conducting programmes. Nair, who was representing Pathanamthitta for a long time, visited the then Kerala CM K. Karunakaran, and bribed him for making a new district. Karunakaran told Nair that for fulfilling his dream, Nair has to resign his post. Thus Nair resigned, and on 1 November 1982, Pathanamthitta district came to being. Later, he returned as MLA through by-elections.

References

External links
 Official page at Kerala Assembly

Communist Party of India (Marxist) politicians from Kerala
1931 births
2013 deaths
People from Pathanamthitta district
Kerala MLAs 1967–1970
Kerala MLAs 1970–1977
Kerala MLAs 1980–1982
Kerala MLAs 1982–1987
Kerala MLAs 1987–1991
Kerala MLAs 1991–1996
Kerala MLAs 1996–2001
Kerala MLAs 2001–2006
Indian National Congress politicians from Kerala